The Kunming dog, Chinese Kunming Dog, Kunming Wolfdog, or Chinese Kunming Wolfdog (Mandarin: 昆明犬 Kūnmíng quǎn) is a wolf-dog breed of working dog developed in Kunming, China in the 1950s from Alsatians hybridized with local dogs; even wolf–dog hybrids. It was recognized as a breed in 2007. It is frequently used by the police and military in its country of origin and has been exported to various other countries. It is the only working dog breed developed in China with international recognition.  It has a yellow and black coat.
The Kumming Dog is also used to perform many duties. These include, but are not limited to, discovering odors emitted by narcotics and explosives, uncovering human remains, and saving people. Male Kumming dogs are usually 60-75 cm in height and female Kumming dogs average a height of 60-65 cm in height making them slightly smaller.

References 

Dog breeds originating in China
Wolf-dog hybrids